Nova Swing is a science fiction novel by M. John Harrison published in 2006.  It takes place in the same universe as Light.  The novel won the Arthur C. Clarke and Philip K. Dick Awards in 2007.

Overview
Nova Swing takes place long after the events of Light, which focussed on a disturbance in the space-time continuum known as the Kefahuchi Tract. The novel's thematic focus is the 'event zone' at the centre of the city Saudade, a space-time membrane created when a piece of the Tract fell to the ground, transforming the appearance and even physics of the event site. The zone draws tourists from Saudade, led by hardened guide Vic Serotonin, who specializes in dangerous "tours" of this chaotic zone. Many of the narrative's threads play out as a consequence of 'artefacts' being brought out of the event zone by tourists. The motif of the event zone recalls the Zone in Roadside Picnic by Boris and Arkady Strugatsky. The novel incorporates some aspects of noir fiction into its scenario.

Reception
Publishers Weekly said " Harrison privileges atmosphere over plot, using grotesquely beautiful narration and elliptical dialogue to convey the beautifully delineated angst of Saudade's extraordinary inhabitants. Although not for everyone, Harrison's trippy style will appeal to sophisticated readers who treasure the work of China Miéville and Jeff VanderMeer."  Regina Schroeder in her review for Booklist said "with its gritty, noirish atmosphere, elements of space opera, and some impressive moments of explosive action, this is a tasty, entertaining morsel, deeply flavored to satisfy the thoughtful."  Kirkus Reviews described it as "a cross between J. G. Ballard's intense, static The Drowned World and Arkady and Boris Strugatsky's terrifying Roadside Picnic. The upshot: This science-fiction noir cum literary and social criticism is memorable, perplexing and challenging in equal measure."

Nova Swing won or was shortlisted for several science fiction awards, including:

2006 British Science Fiction Association Award nominee

2007 Arthur C. Clarke Award winner 
2007 Philip K. Dick Award winner
2007 British Fantasy Award nominee
2007 John W. Campbell Award nominee

Critical essays
Leigh Blackmore. "Undoing the Mechanisms: Genre Expectation, Subversion and Anti-Consolation in the Kefahuchi Tract Novels of M. John Harrison." Studies in the Fantastic. 2 (Winter 2008/Spring 2009). (University of Tampa Press).

Notes

External links
 Nova Swing at Worlds Without End

2006 British novels
2006 science fiction novels
British science fiction novels
Victor Gollancz Ltd books